Şahamettin Kuzucular (born 1961), is a Turkish, poet, author and editor-in-chief of the  literally meaning "Literature and Art Academy". He is noted for his prose poetry.

Education and personal life 
Kuzucular was born in 1961 in the city of Sivas where he completed his primary and secondary education. Following this he was accepted into the Literature Faculty of the Ankara University and graduated from there in 1985. After some time working in commerce he went to do his Military service where he served in Bilecik and Izmir. During his military service he did a pedagogical exam which he passed, and this allowed him to start working in Kars after the end of his military service. In 1989 he married and completed a masters degree at Sivas Cumhuriyet University. He then started to teach at Hatay Dörtyol.

Career 
He is one of the major representatives of prose poetry in Turkey along with Mehmet Rauf, Edip Cansever, Enis Batur, İbrahim Şinasi, Yakup Kadri Karaosmanoğlu, Ahmet Oktay, Halit Ziya Uşaklıgil, Tevfik Fikret and Cenap Şahabettin.

He currently is a teacher at Hatay Dörtyol. He is also the president of the  "Literature Art and Artists Society", and editor-in-chief of the  literally meaning "Literature and Art Academy", the latter of which he founded in 2009. According the Kuzucular, ESA us the most serious source of information on Traditional Turkish Arts and Fine arts.

Works
Özleşim " Özleşmeyi Özleyen Öznelerin Eylemesi", – 2008

Dörtyol Hatay Çukurova Tarihi ve Türkmenleri,- 2012
İlk Kurşun – 2017
Çukurova Gâvurdağı Tarihi ve Türkmenleri – 2018
Alaçıktan Gökdelene – March 2018
Eşref Bey İle Zühre Han – January 2018
Ahi Baba Çıkmazları – November 2021

References 

Turkish poets
Turkish writers
1961 births
Living people